Daniele Paponi (born 16 April 1988) is an Italian footballer who plays as a forward for  club Imolese.

Club career

Parma
Paponi started his career with Ancona, playing into the biancorossi youth ranks. In the summer 2004, following the folding of his club, Paponi became a free agent; he then accepted an offer from Parma and joined the ducali youth team.

He made his Serie A debut at the age of 17 on 22 October 2005, then also making his debut at the European level in the 2006–07 UEFA Cup, scoring also two goals. His first Serie A goal came in an away league match played against Messina on 20 December 2006, and ended in a 1–1 draw: Paponi's equaliser goal, a reversed bicycle kick immediately dubbed as "scorpion kick", was saluted among the finest scored in the league season. Nevertheless, Paponi struggled to find space in the first team in the following 2007–08 season, and in January 2008 he accepted a loan move to Serie B's Cesena, where he scored two goals in 21 games.

For the 2008–09 season he returned to Parma, then in Serie B, playing seven games and scoring twice, but in January 2009 he was loaned out again, this time to Rimini as part of the deal that brought then-Serie B topscorer Daniele Vantaggiato to join the gialloblu.

Bologna
On 10 June 2010 Parma exchanged the 22-year-old striker with Gabriele Paonessa of Bologna in co-ownership deal. Both players' 50% registration rights was valued €600,000. Paponi signed a 5-year contract worth €120,000 in net annually plus bonuses. The deal never a successful deal on the field as both players failed to take part in the first team, but a successful financial deal that both club had a player selling profit of €1.2 million in 2009–10 season but only would counter-weight by the amortization of the buying cost of the same amount in next 5 seasons (2010 to 2015, the contract length of both players) plus VAT. Paponi also became a financial burden of the club for his wage in 2013. Paponi only played once in 2011–12 Serie A. In June 2012, Paonessa was definitively under contract with Parma as well as Paponi to Bologna.

In 2012–13 Paponi missed a few games due to injuries. However, his own quality had limited his chance to play: only 3 games in 2012–13 Serie A, all as substitutes. In April 2013 he left for Canada to have a trial with Montreal Impact.

Montreal
On 19 April 2013 Paponi joined Montreal Impact on loan until 31 December 2013. He has officially scored his first goal for Montreal Impact on 29 June 2013 in an MLS match against Colorado Rapids, where he actually went on to score a brace.
Ancona
On 4 August 2014 he was signed by the third-tier club Ancona in temporary deal.

Latina
On 20 August 2015 Paponi was signed by U.S. Latina Calcio for free, with Marco Crimi moved to opposite direction. for €730,000. Paponi signed a 2-year contract.

Juve Stabia
Paponi left Latina for Juve Stabia on 20 January 2017. He renewed the contract on 11 August. He was part of the first team squad for the entire 2017 pre-season.

Piacenza
On 1 August 2019, he signed with Piacenza.

Padova
On 1 September 2020 he joined Padova on a 2-year contract.

Bari
On 1 September 2021, Paponi joined Serie C club Bari.

Imolese
On 6 January 2023, Paponi signed with Imolese.

Career statistics

Honours
Montreal Impact
Canadian Championship (1): 2013

Bari
 Serie C: 2021–22 (Group C)

References

External links
 Profile at AIC.football.it

1988 births
Living people
Sportspeople from Ancona
Italian footballers
Association football forwards
Serie A players
Serie B players
Serie C players
A.C. Ancona players
Parma Calcio 1913 players
A.C. Cesena players
Rimini F.C. 1912 players
A.C. Perugia Calcio players
Bologna F.C. 1909 players
Latina Calcio 1932 players
S.S. Juve Stabia players
Piacenza Calcio 1919 players
Calcio Padova players
S.S.C. Bari players
Imolese Calcio 1919 players
Major League Soccer players
CF Montréal players
Italian expatriate footballers
Italian expatriate sportspeople in Canada
Expatriate soccer players in Canada
Italy youth international footballers
Footballers from Marche